"For a Minute" is a song by English recording trio M.O. It was co-written by Jess Glynne and produced by Bless Beats and Loadstar. The song was released by Operator Records as a digital download on 13 April 2014 in the United Kingdom, marking the trio's debut single after buzz tracks "On Ya", "Hot", "Wait Your Turn", "Come Let Me Show You", and "Ain't Got Time".

Music video
A music video for "For a Minute" premiered on the band's YouTube channel on 27 February 2014.

Track listing

Chart performance

Release history

References

External links

2014 songs
2014 debut singles
M.O songs
Songs written by Jess Glynne